Mount Ross is a  mountain summit located in the North Cascades, in Whatcom County, Washington, United States.

Description
Mount Ross is situated within North Cascades National Park and Stephen Mather Wilderness. It rises steeply from the North Cascades Highway and Newhalem, Washington, which are both set at the southern foot of the mountain. Like many North Cascades peaks, Mount Ross is more notable for its large, steep rise above local terrain than for its absolute elevation. The nearest higher peak is The Roost,  to the north. Precipitation runoff from the mountain drains into the Skagit.

History
This geographical feature's name has been officially adopted by the U.S. Board on Geographic Names to honor James Delmage Ross (1872–1939), the superintendent of the Skagit River Hydroelectric Project. Ross Dam and Ross Lake also bear his name. Mount Ross was first climbed on August 17, 1969, by Jack Roper, Maurine Roper, and Jan Bergerson.

Climate
Mount Ross is located in the marine west coast climate zone of western North America. Most weather fronts originate in the Pacific Ocean, and travel northeast toward the Cascade Mountains. As fronts approach the North Cascades, they are forced upward by the peaks of the Cascade Range, causing them to drop their moisture in the form of rain or snowfall onto the Cascades (Orographic lift). As a result, the west side of the North Cascades experiences high precipitation, especially during the winter months in the form of snowfall. Because of maritime influence, snow tends to be wet and heavy, resulting in high avalanche danger. During winter months, weather is usually cloudy, but due to high pressure systems over the Pacific Ocean that intensify during summer months, there is often little or no cloud cover during the summer.

Geology
The North Cascades features some of the most rugged topography in the Cascade Range with craggy peaks, ridges, and deep glacial valleys. Geological events occurring many years ago created the diverse topography and drastic elevation changes over the Cascade Range leading to the various climate differences. These climate differences lead to vegetation variety defining the ecoregions in this area.

The history of the formation of the Cascade Mountains dates back millions of years ago to the late Eocene Epoch. With the North American Plate overriding the Pacific Plate, episodes of volcanic igneous activity persisted. In addition, small fragments of the oceanic and continental lithosphere called terranes created the North Cascades about 50 million years ago.

During the Pleistocene period dating back over two million years ago, glaciation advancing and retreating repeatedly scoured the landscape leaving deposits of rock debris. The "U"-shaped cross section of the river valleys are a result of recent glaciation. Uplift and faulting in combination with glaciation have been the dominant processes which have created the tall peaks and deep valleys of the North Cascades area.

Gallery

See also

Geography of the North Cascades

References

External links
North Cascades National Park National Park Service
 Weather: Mount Ross

Ross
Ross
Ross
Ross
Ross
Ross